Rudsar or Rud Sar (also Romanized as Rūd Sar) is a village in Blukat Rural District, Rahmatabad and Blukat District, Rudbar County, Gilan Province, Iran. At the 2006 census, its population was 554, in 134 families.

References 

Populated places in Rudbar County